The Lagunitas Brewing Company, founded in 1993 in Lagunitas, California, is a subsidiary of  Heineken International. Before Heineken bought a 50% share of the company in 2015, the company met the definition of a craft brewery. Two years prior it ranked fifth top-selling craft brewery in the US. Heineken purchased the remainder of the company in 2017.

History
The brewery was founded in 1993 by Tony Magee in Lagunitas, California, and moved a year later to nearby Petaluma, California, after they quickly outgrew their original rural West Marin location.

Before being taken over by Heineken, Lagunitas was one of the fastest-growing craft breweries in the United States. In March 2011, the company had 92 employees with distribution in 32 states.

On April 9, 2012, Lagunitas announced plans for a new Chicago-based brewery equipped with a 250 barrel brew house which will also have a  capacity. In May 2012 it was announced that the company had signed a lease for a location in the city's Douglas Park neighborhood in North Lawndale, "that will put [it] in a space owned by film studio Cinespace...for at least 20 years." The Chicago brewery started producing beer on April 18, 2014, and opened an on-premises taproom a few months thereafter. A third brewery was planned to be built in Azusa, California, however the brewery has not become operational as the result of a slowdown in growth.

In December 2014 Lagunitas filed a lawsuit against Sierra Nevada Brewing Company over the use and style of the letters IPA on their label. The lawsuit was dropped a month later after public outcry.

On September 8, 2015, Heineken International acquired a 50% stake in the company to help it expand its operations globally. As a result of the deal, Lagunitas was no longer considered a craft brewery under the Brewers Association definition of "craft", since Heineken's stake was greater than 25%. Less than two years later, on May 4, 2017, Heineken purchased the remaining portion of Lagunitas, making it the sole owner of the brewery. Founder Tony Magee continued as CEO of Lagunitas, with the intention of expanding production and distribution of Lagunitas beers worldwide.

Cannabis associations
The brewery has long-standing associations with cannabis, which have at times caused legal problems. Some beers have had names associated with the plant, in one case resulting in a name being banned, and using the number 420 in internal materials and external advertising.

On Saint Patrick's Day in 2005, the California Department of Alcoholic Beverage Control raided a weekly tasting party at the brewery to investigate alleged cannabis dealing by employees. Officers had staked out the brewery for two months to observe people consuming cannabis on the premises. No charges were filed. Magee admits "no one was willing to sell it to them, but everyone was willing to give it to them for free." Lagunitas was found in violation of Section 24200 of California's Business and Professions Code, better known as its "disorderly house" law. Lagunitas was eventually served a twenty-day suspension of operations and the ordeal was commemorated with a beer named Undercover Investigation Shut-down Ale.

Lagunitas dropped '420' from its labels in 2013 after a trademark claim by Sweetwater Brewing Company.

In 2018, Lagunitas released a IPA-inspired sparkling water infused with THC and CBD. The beverage is called "Hi-Fi Hops" and is a collaboration with AbsoluteXtracts, a cannabis grower. It is currently only available in California.

See also
 California breweries

Notes

References

External links
 Official Site

Beer brewing companies based in the San Francisco Bay Area
Companies based in Sonoma County, California
Heineken brands